Phil Albert (April 4, 1944 – December 8, 2020) was an American football player and coach. He was the second head football coach at Towson University, serving from 1972 to 1991 and compiling a record of 117–91–3. Albert led the Tigers to the program's first conference championship in 1974 when they went 10–0 and won the Mason–Dixon Conference title.

Albert played college football at the University of Arizona.  When he was named as the Tigers' coach at the age of 28, he was one of the youngest head football coaches in the nation, and Towson was starting just its fourth season of college football. Over the next 20 years, Albert directed the very young program to success at three different levels of NCAA competition. His teams advanced to the NCAA postseason four times.

He was named "Coach of the Year" five times. He coached 28 All-Americans and four National Football League (NFL) players, including Sean Landeta and Dave Meggett. In 1994, Phil was inducted into the Towson University Athletic Hall of Fame. From 1994 to 2001, he worked with the San Diego Chargers organization as the advanced game day scout.

Head coaching record

References

1944 births
2020 deaths
American football quarterbacks
Arizona Wildcats football players
Cisco Wranglers football players
San Diego Chargers scouts
Towson Tigers football coaches
Towson University faculty
Coaches of American football from Pennsylvania
Players of American football from Pennsylvania